Beneke is a surname. Notable people with the surname include:
Donald Beneke (1916–1990), American politician from Iowa
Everett Smith Beneke (1918–2010), American medical mycologist
Friedrich Eduard Beneke (1798 – ), German psychologist and philosopher
Martin Beneke (born 1966), German physicist
Paul Beneke  (early 1400s - ), German town councilor and privateer
Tex Beneke (1914–2000), American saxophonist, singer and bandleader

Fiction
Ted Beneke

German-language surnames
Surnames from given names